Jephtah's Daughter: A Biblical Tragedy is a 1909 American silent short film starring Annette Kellerman. The National Film and Television Archive of the British Film Institute has a print.

See also
Judges 11

References

Silent American drama films
American silent short films
American black-and-white films
Vitagraph Studios short films
Films based on the Hebrew Bible
1909 films
Book of Judges people
1909 drama films
1900s American films